The Resistance Memorial Cross or Resistance Commemorative Cross is a medal awarded in the Netherlands to members of the Dutch resistance during the Second World War.

The medal was instituted by Royal Decree (No. 104) on 29 December 1980, after the 35th anniversary of the liberation of the Netherlands. It is worn after the War Memorial Cross and before the Medal of Order and Peace. The cross is only awarded at the request of a person eligible to receive it. Approximately 15,000 have been awarded, recorded in the Gedenkenboek verzetsherdenkingskruis.

Criteria
The Resistance Memorial Cross may be awarded to:
Members of resistance groups recognised in the Royal Decree dated 5 September 1944 or to any resistance group known to the Council on Extraordinary Pensions or the 1940-1945 Foundation.
Anyone recognised by the Council on Extraordinary Pension as a participant in the resistance, regardless of whether they were awarded a pension.
Individuals defined by the Law on the Improvement of the Legal Status of Resistance Fighters (law of 1/20/76, Stb. 19) adjudged as having spent time in service to the resistance.
Soldiers of the Dutch Internal Armed Forces in occupied territory.
Those who participated in actions during World War II in Japanese or Japanese-occupied territory, which after the war, were designated as resistance of the enemy by the committee.
Anyone who does not meet any preceding provisions, may still be considered a participant in the resistance in the judgement of the committee.

Appearance
The medal comprises a silver cross hung from a striped ribbon. The obverse of the cross bears a vertical flaming sword, surmounted by the Dutch royal crown. Below the sword are the dates 1940 above 1945. The horizontal arms of the cross are inscribed with the words DE TYRANNY VERDRYVEN (Dutch: "to expel tyranny"), a line in the Dutch national anthem. The reverse bears a Dutch lion, and the date of institution, 1980. The cross is suspended by a ring from a ribbon coloured with asymmetric stripes: the left half is red-white-blue (for the Dutch flag) and the right half orange (the national color of the Netherlands) with a black border on each edge.

Recipients 

 Aart Alblas
 Willem Arondeus
 Tex Banwell
 Ina Boekbinder
 Jaap Burger
 Gerrit Dunnewind
 Hendrika Gerritsen
 Cornelis Pieter van den Hoek
 Hans Hoets
 Jan de Koning
 Sicco Mansholt
 Norbert Schmelzer
 Pieter Meindert Schreuder
 Leonard Willmott
 Petrus Wijtse Winkel
 Ida Veldhuyzen van Zanten

Dutch Cross of Resistance
It should not to be confused with the rarer and more prestigious Dutch Cross of Resistance (Dutch: Verzetskruis), the second highest decoration for valour in the Netherlands, which was instituted in 1946 and awarded to only 95 people. There was a belief after the War that awarding medals would make distinctions between different acts of resistance, all of which would have been punishable by death. After a first round of awards were made of the Dutch Cross of Resistance in 1946, it became politically difficult to agree a list of further recipients.

References

External links
 The legacy of Nazi occupation: patriotic memory and national recovery in Western Europe, 1945-1965, Pieter Lagrou, Cambridge University Press, 2000, p. 74-77
 onderscheidingen.nl
 tracesofwar.com

 
Orders, decorations, and medals of the Netherlands
Awards established in 1980
Dutch resistance